Juan Pablo Villegas Cardona (born 15 October 1987 in Pácora, Caldas) is a Colombian former professional cyclist, who rode professionally in 2011 and from 2013 to 2018, for  and . He currently works as a directeur sportif for UCI Continental team .

Major results
2012
 Vuelta a Venezuela
1st Stages 6 & 9
2014
 1st  Overall Vuelta Mexico Telmex
1st Stages 1, 4 & 5 (ITT)
2017
 1st Stage 12 Vuelta a Colombia

References

External links

1987 births
Living people
Colombian male cyclists
Vuelta a Colombia stage winners
People from Caldas Department